John Andrews Murrell (1806 – November 21, 1844), the "Great Western Land Pirate", was a 19th-century bandit and criminal operating along the Natchez Trace and Mississippi River, in the southern United States. He was also known as John A. Murrell, and his surname was commonly spelled as Murel and Murrel. His exploits were widely known, and he became a legendary figure in fiction, film and television in the 20th century. 

He was first convicted as a youth for the crime of horse theft. He was branded with an "HT", flogged, and sentenced to six years in prison. He was released in 1829. Murrell was convicted the second and last time for the crime of slave stealing, in the Circuit Court of Madison County, Tennessee. He was incarcerated in the Tennessee State Penitentiary in Nashville from 1834 to 1844.

Early life
According to Tennessee prison records, John Andrews Murrell was born in Lunenburg County, Virginia, and raised in Williamson County, Tennessee.  Murrell was the son of Jeffrey Murrell and Zilpha Andrews, and was the third born of eight children. While he was incarcerated in Nashville for slave stealing, his mother, wife, and two children lived in the vicinity of Denmark, Tennessee.

Punishment and imprisonment
John A. Murrell had his first criminal conviction, for horse theft, as a teenager and was branded on the base of his thumb with an "HT" for horse thief, flogged, and sentenced to six years in prison. He was released in 1829. Murrell was convicted a second and final time, for the crime of slave stealing, in the Circuit Court of Madison County, Tennessee, and incarcerated in the Tennessee State Penitentiary in Nashville from 1834 to 1844.
While in the Tennessee State Penitentiary, Murrell, as part of his reform, was required to work as a blacksmith.  A decade in prison under the Auburn penitentiary system, of mandatory convict regimentation, through prison uniforms, lockstep, silence, and occasional solitary confinement, were said to break Murrell mentally and supposedly left him an imbecile.  He spent the last months of his life as a blacksmith in Pikeville, Tennessee.  

The Nashville Daily American newspaper reported a different account of his last year of life. It said that when Murrell was released from prison, at 38 years old, he became a reformed man, and a Methodist in good standing. He worked as a carpenter by trade, and lived at a boarding house in Pikeville.

Death
In a deathbed confession, Murrell admitted to being guilty of most of the crimes charged against him except murder, to which he claimed to be "guiltless". John A. Murrell died on November 21, 1844, nine months after leaving prison. He was reported to have contracted "pulmonary consumption", now known as tuberculosis. Murrell was interred at Smyrna First United Methodist Church Cemetery, in Smyrna, Tennessee. After Murrell died, parts of him were dug up and stolen by grave robbers. Although the corpse had been half-eaten by scavenging hogs, the head was separated from the torso, pickled, and displayed at county fairs. His skull is missing, but the Tennessee State Museum holds one of his thumbs.

Accepted claims 
Accepted facts about his life include stealing horses, for which he was branded. He was also caught with a freed slave living on his property.  Murrell was known to kidnap slaves and sell them to other slave owners.  He received his 10-year prison sentence for slave-stealing.  Murrell would be considered a conductor on the Reverse Underground Railroad.

"The Murrell Excitement"
In 1835, Virgil Stewart wrote that a slave rebellion was being organized by highwaymen and Northern abolitionists. On Christmas Day, 1835, Murrell and his "Mystic Clan" planned to incite an uprising in every slaveholding state by invoking the Haitian Revolution, the most successful slave rebellion in history.  Murrell believed that a slave rebellion would enable him to take over the South, and make New Orleans the center of operations of his criminal empire. 

Stewart's account of his interactions with Murrell was published as a pamphlet, and Stewart wrote the pamphlet under the pseudonym "Augustus Q. Walton, Esq.," for whom he invented a fictitious background and profession. The validity of the pamphlet has been debated since its publication. Some historians assert that Stewart's pamphlet was largely fictional and that Murrell (and his brothers) were at best inept thieves, who had caused their father to go bankrupt as he raised bail money for them. 

Given Nat Turner's slave rebellion in 1831 in Virginia, slaveholders were always ready to believe conspiracies of new violence, especially in the Deep South where whites were far outnumbered by blacks. Those aroused by the pamphlet became part of increasing tensions and outbreaks known as the "Murrell Excitement".  During this time, tension between the races and between locals and outsiders increased.  On July 4, 1835, disturbances occurred in the red-light districts of Nashville and Memphis, Tennessee, and Natchez, Mississippi. 20 slaves and 10 white men were hanged after confessing (under torture and coercion) to complicity in Murrell's plot.  

On July 6 in Vicksburg, Mississippi, an angry mob decided to expel all professional gamblers from the town, based on a rumor that gamblers were part of the plot. When the gamblers resisted, the mob lynched and hanged five of them. Similar panic surrounding Murrell and his conspiracy spread throughout the South long after his death, with cities from Huntsville, Alabama, to New Orleans, Louisiana, creating committees dedicated to identifying Murrell's conspirators and potential signs of slave rebellion.

Disputed claims 
Murrell was known as a "land-pirate", using the Mississippi River as a base for his operations. He used a network of 300 to 1,000, and even as many as 2,500 (as some newspaper reports claimed) fellow bandits collectively known as the Mystic Clan to pull off his escapades. Many of his followers were believed to be members of mixed-race groups known as the Melungeons and Redbones. He was also known as a bushwhacker along the Natchez Trace. 

Murrell posed as a traveling preacher. Twain and others wrote that he would preach to a congregation while his gang stole the horses outside, but they also said that Murrell's horse was always left behind. The location of his hideout and operations base has been debated. Possibilities were Jackson County, Tennessee; Natchez, Mississippi, at Devil's Punch Bowl; Tunica County, Mississippi; the Neutral Ground in Louisiana; and Island 37 on the Mississippi River. One record, a genealogical note, places him as far east as Georgia. Atlanta historian Franklin Garrett wrote that a lawless district in that town was named for him in the 1840s, as "Murrell's Row". Because Murrell came to symbolize lawlessness along the Natchez Trace in the antebellum era,  his "hideouts" (whether any hideouts existed or not) were said to be located at most of the well-known areas of such lawlessness along the Trace.

Stewart published his account of Murrell's plot in 1835. Just before Murrell was apprehended, he was rumored to be leading a slave revolt in New Orleans in an attempt to take over the city and become a sort of criminal potentate of Louisiana. Some say he began to plot his takeover of New Orleans in 1841, although he was then in the sixth year of a 10-year sentence in the prison at Nashville. Others say he operated as a criminal from 1835 to 1857. He was in prison for 10 of those years and died of tuberculosis in 1844 shortly after being released. (Does not agree with end date of 1857.) 

A stream in Chicot County, Arkansas, called Whiskey Chute, was named in 1855 for Murrell's raid on a whiskey-carrying steamboat that was sunk after it was pillaged. From Record Group 25, "Prison Records for the Main Prison at Nashville, Tennessee, 1831-1922," Murrell was born in 1806, most likely in Williamson County, Tennessee.

In popular culture

In The Adventures of Tom Sawyer, Injun Joe and his accomplice find a treasure which they believe to be spoils from Murrell's robberies. Tom Sawyer and Huckleberry Finn claim it in the end.
Jorge Luis Borges referred to him in his fictional story, "The Cruel Redeemer Lazarus Morell", written between 1933 and 1934 and published in A Universal History of Iniquity in 1935.  
Murrell was a fictional character in the movie Virginia City (1940), in which he was played by Humphrey Bogart as the leader of a gang of "banditos" during the American Civil War of the early 1860s. (This was after his historic time.)
Eudora Welty featured a highwayman named James Murrell in her short story "A Still Moment", collected in The Wide Net and Other Stories (1943).
Robert Lewis Taylor referred to him as a fictional character in his novel The Travels of Jamie McPheeters. Murrell also appeared in the 1963 television show based on the book, and was portrayed by James Westerfield.
Gary Jennings used him as a fictional character in his novel Sow the Seeds of Hemp (1976).
Murrell's purported treasure digures in the Aaron and Adam Nee film Band of Robbers (2015), loosely based on Mark Twain's The Adventures of Tom Sawyer and Adventures of Huckleberry Finn.
William Faulkner mentioned Murrell in his story entitled "The Courthouse". 
Harry Harrison Kroll referred to Murrell as a figure in his novel Rogue's Company (1943).

See also
John Crenshaw
James Ford (pirate)

References

Sources
Block, Lawrence.  Gangsters, swindlers, killers, and thieves: the lives and crimes of fifty American villains.  Oxford University Press US, 2004, 9780195169522. 
Burroughs, Stephen.  Memoirs of the notorious Stephen Burroughs.  C. Gaylord, 1835.
Botkin, B.A.  A Treasury of Mississippi River folklore: stories, ballads & traditions of the mid-American river country.  Crown Publishers, 1955.
Hall, Elihu Nicholas. Anna's War Against River Pirates and Cave Bandits of John A. Murrell's Northern Dive. Unpublished manuscripts in S.I.U. Rare Book Collections. Revised and published as Ballads From the Bluffs.  1948.
Henry, Hollow Meadoes.  The police control of the slave in South Carolina. Vanderbilt University, 1914. 
Penick, James L.  The great western land pirate: John A. Murrell in legend and history.  Columbia, MO:  University of Missouri Press, 1981.
Phares, Ross.  Reverend Devil: Master Criminal of the Old South.  Gretna, LA:  Publisher Pelican Publishing, 1941.
Rothman, Joshua D. Flush Times and Fever Dreams: A Story of Capitalism and Slavery in the Age of Jackson. University of Georgia Press, 2012.
Sandlin, Lee.  Wicked River: The Mississippi When It Last Ran Wild. Pantheon, 2010.
Smith, Thomas Ruys.  "Independence Day, 1835: The John A. Murrell Conspiracy and the Lynching of the Vicksburg Gamblers in Literature," The Mississippi Quarterly*. Volume: 59. Issue: 1–2. Publication Date: Winter, 2005.
Stewart, Virgil A.  The history of Virgil A. Stewart: and his adventure in capturing and exposing the great "western land pirate" and his gang, in connexion with the evidence; also of the trials, confessions, and execution of a number of Murrell's associates in the state of Mississippi during the summer of 1835, and the execution of five professional gamblers by the citizens of Vicksburg, on the 6th July, 1835  New York, NY: Harper and Brothers, 1836.
Twain, Mark.  Chapter XXIX, Life on the Mississippi.  Harper, 1883.
Walton, Augustus Q.  A history of the detection, conviction, life and designs of John A. Murel, the great western land pirate..  Athens, TN:  G. White, 1835.
Wellman, Paul L.  Spawn of Evil. Doubleday and Company, 1964.
Wyatt-Brown, Bertram.  Southern Honor: Ethics and Behavior in the Old South.  Oxford University Press, New York, 1982, 978-0-19-503119-5. 
National Police Gazette, eds. "The Life and Adventures of John A. Murrell, the Great Western Land Pirate," National Police Gazette.  H. Long and Brother, 1847.
The Pictorial Life and Adventures of John A. Murrell, the Great Western Land Pirate: With Twenty-one Large Spirited Engravings "Murrell!" "Hare!" and "Turpin" series!.  Philadelphia, PA:  T. B. Peterson and brothers, 1849.

External links
Report of Murrell's treasure at Honey Island
"The Great Western Land Pirate, Again" by William Edward Henry
The Robber John Murrell and his Famous Hideouts
The Strange Story Behind the State's Thumb 
The Life and Adventures of John A. Murrell, the Great Western Land Pirate
History of the Detection, Conviction, Life and Designs of John A. Murrell, the Great Western Land Pirate
 "How Missing Court Records Created a Folk Legend from Nashville’s Wild Past"

1806 births
1844 deaths
19th-century American businesspeople
19th-century American criminals
19th-century deaths from tuberculosis
American blacksmiths
American outlaws
American prisoners and detainees
Crime families
Criminals from Tennessee
Fugitives
Outlaw gangs in the United States
Prisoners and detainees of Tennessee
People from Williamson County, Tennessee
People from Lunenburg County, Virginia
People from Pikeville, Tennessee
Tuberculosis deaths in Tennessee